Anne Newdigate may refer to:

 Anne Seymour, Duchess of Somerset (1497–1587), who married Francis Newdigate
 Anne Newdigate (1574–1618), gentlewoman and letter writer